Róbert Zsolnai (born 11 April 1982 in Budapest, Hungary) is a professional Hungarian footballer currently playing for Budapest Honvéd FC in the Hungarian Borsodi Liga. His former clubs include Vasas SC, BKV Előre, Vác FC Zollner, Kaposvár.

On 24 November 2007, it was announced, that he will leave for Budapest Honvéd FC.

Club career

Vasas SC
He made his debut of 17 March 2001 against FC Sopron in a match that ended 1-1.

Kaposvári Rákóczi FC
He made his debut of 14 August 2004 against FC Sopron in a match that ended 0-0.

Debreceni VSC
He made his debut of 29 July 2006 against Pécsi Mecsek FC in a match that ended 2–1.

Budapest Honved
He made his debut of 23 February 2008 against Rákospalotai EAC in a match that ended 1-1.

Club honours

Vasas SC
Hungarian National Championship I:
3rd place: 2000–01

Debreceni VSC
Hungarian National Championship I:
Winner: 2006–07
Hungarian Cup:
Runners-up: 2006–07
Hungarian Super Cup:
Winner: 2006

Budapest Honvéd FC
Hungarian Cup:
Runners-up: 2007–08
Hungarian Super Cup:
Runners-up: 2007, 2009

References

Budapest Honved Official Website
Player profile at HLSZ

1982 births
Living people
Footballers from Budapest
Hungarian footballers
Association football forwards
Vasas SC players
Csepel SC footballers
Kecskeméti TE players
BKV Előre SC footballers
Kaposvári Rákóczi FC players
Debreceni VSC players
Budapest Honvéd FC players
Szolnoki MÁV FC footballers
Puskás Akadémia FC players
Nemzeti Bajnokság I players